Mendi Mendiyan is a 1910 Basque language opera by the Basque composer José María Usandizaga.

Recordings
Marco Polo 2CD

References

Compositions by José María Usandizaga
1910 operas
Operas
Basque language